Elections to Liverpool City Council were held on 1 May 2003.  One third of the council was up for election and the Liberal Democrat party kept overall control of the council. Overall turnout was 21.7%.

After the election, the composition of the council was

Election result

Ward results

Abercromby

Aigburth

Allerton

Anfield

Arundel

Breckfield

Broadgreen

Childwall

Church

Clubmoor

County

Croxteth

Dingle

Dovecot

Everton

Fazakerley

Gillmoss

Granby

Grasswndale

Kensington

Melrose

Netherley

Old Swan

Picton

Pirrie

St. Mary's

Smithdown

Speke

Tuebrook

Valley

Vauxhall

Warbreck

Woolton

References

2003
2003 English local elections
2000s in Liverpool